El Rock de Mi Pueblo (English: The Rock of My Village) is the eleventh studio album recorded by Colombian singer-songwriter Carlos Vives. It was released on August 31, 2004.

Track listing
 "Como Tú" (C. Medina, C. Vives) – 3:21
 "Maravilla" (A. Castro, C. Vives) – 3:39
 "Maleta de Sueños" (A. Castro, C. Vives) – 3:31
 "Fuerza del Amor" (A. Castro, C. Medina, C. Vives) – 3:24
 "Qué Tiene la Noche" (C. Medina, C. Vives) – 3:54
 "Voy a Olvidarme de Mí" (C. Vives) – 3:35
 "La Llamada" (C. Vives, E. Cuadrado) – 3:38
 "Santa Marta-Kingston-New Orleans" (A. Castro, C. Vives) – 3:50
 "Princesa y el Soldado" (A. Castro, C. Vives) – 4:44
 "Gallito de Caramelo" (C. Vives) – 3:35
 "Rock de Mi Pueblo" (C. Medina, C. Vives) – 3:59
 "El Duro – El Original" (C. Vives) – 1:07

Personnel
Credits for El Rock de Mi Pueblo from liner notes.

Musicians

Carlos Vives – Vocals, Guitar, Choir
Archie Pena – Percussion, Conga, Drums, Redoblante
Sebastian Krys – Choir
Mayte Montero – Maracas, Gaita, Guache
Ramon Benítez – Bombard
Egidio Cuadrado – Accordion, Choir
Andrés Castro – Acoustic guitar, Electric guitar, Charango, Choir

Carlos Huertas – Choir
Pablo Bernal – Drums
Tedoy Mullet – Trombone, Trumpet
Carlos Ivan Medina – Choir
Luis Ángel – Double Bass, Six-String Bass
Paquito Hechavarría – Piano
Gaitanes – Choir
Ricardo Gaitán – Choir
Alberto Gaitán – Choir

Production

Emilio Estefan Jr. – Producer
Sebastian Krys – Producer
Andrés Castro – Producer
Carlos Vives – Liner Notes
Scott Canto – Engineer
Mike Couzzi – Engineer
Bob Ludwig – Mastering
Kevin Dillon – Logistics

Mayte Montero – Arranger
Lucho Correa – Graphic Design
Egidio Cuadrado – Arranger
David Heuer – Engineer
Javier Garza – Engineer
Elias Chacin – Assistant Engineer
Steve Menezes – Studio Coordinator
Jose A. Maldonado – Logistics
Trevor Fletcher – Studio Coordinator

Charts sales

Weekly charts

Sales and certifications

References

External links
 El Rock de Mi Pueblo at Amazon

2004 albums
Carlos Vives albums
Albums produced by Emilio Estefan
Latin Grammy Award for Best Contemporary Tropical Album
Albums produced by Sebastian Krys